Baccharis genistelloides is a species of flowering plant from the family Asteraceae. B. genistelloides is one of the most studied species in its genus Baccharis regarding its phytochemistry and pharmacological effects. The plant species is widely used in folk medicine.

The plant has been used as a folk treatment of high blood pressure, diabetes, stomachaches, and kidney infections. B.genistelloides contains flavonoids that may have anti-inflammatory effects.

The plant is perennial.

The species along with almost all Baccharis species is dioecious. With the flowers on this plant being unisexual.

It is found in countries such as Peru, Bolivia, Chile, Brazil, Colombia, Ecuador, Paraguay, and Uruguay.

Common names 
In Andean communities it is locally known as quina senqa.

In Portuguese it goes by the common name carque, bacante, and carqueja.

References 

genistelloides